The New York State Council on the Arts (NYSCA) is an arts council serving the U.S. state of New York.  It was established in 1960 through a bill introduced in the New York State Legislature by New York State Senator MacNeil Mitchell (1905–1996), with backing from Governor Nelson Rockefeller, and began its work in 1961. It awards more than 1,900 grants each year to arts, culture, and heritage non-profits and artists throughout the state.  Its headquarters are in Manhattan, New York City.

As stated on its website, the council "is dedicated to preserving and expanding the rich and diverse cultural resources that are and will become the heritage of New York's citizens."

The Chairperson of NYSCA is Katherine Nicholls, and the executive director is Mara Manus.

External links
New York State Council on the Arts official site

Arts councils of the United States
Arts organizations based in New York City
1960 establishments in New York (state)
Arts organizations established in 1960
Government agencies established in 1960
Special Tony Award recipients